NBS (National Building Specification) is a UK-based business providing construction specification information used by architects, engineers and other building professionals to describe the materials, standards and workmanship of a construction project. It was launched in 1973 and its information is now used by over 5000 offices.

A specification often forms part of the tender documentation along with architectural drawings for a contractor to price and then forms part of the contract documentation for the builder to construct the building. Since 1988 the NBS data has been structured on the Common Arrangement of Work Sections. 

Until 2018, NBS was owned by the Royal Institute of British Architects (RIBA) via its RIBA Enterprises subsidiary. In June 2018, the RIBA announced it was selling a £31.8 million stake in RIBA Enterprises, to LDC, the private equity arm of Lloyds Bank. In November 2020, NBS was sold to Byggfakta Group, a Sweden-based information services provider. In early 2021 the RIBA received £113 million from the sale of its stake in NBS.

Products
NBS maintains and updates Uniclass 2015, a unified classification system for all sectors of the UK construction industry originally released in 1997.

In 2012, NBS launched the National BIM Library, featuring a range of generic and proprietary construction elements suitable for building information modeling.

In 2019 NBS released NBS Chorus, a fully online specification platform for construction.

In 2020 NBS released NBS Source, a new online tool, incorporating the National BIM Library, that created a single source for product information.

References

External links

The National BIM Library
https://www.thenbs.com/nbs-source
https://www.thenbs.com/nbs-chorus

Construction standards
Royal Institute of British Architects
1973 introductions
Standards of the United Kingdom